The decade of the 1260s in art involved some significant events.

Events
1268: Earliest known reference to a guild of stainers, predecessors of the Worshipful Company of Painter-Stainers, in the City of London.

Paintings

Births
 1269: Huáng Gōngwàng – Chinese painter from Jiangsu during the Yuan Dynasty (died 1354)
 1267: Giotto – Italian painter and architect from Florence (died 1337)
 1262: Guan Daosheng – Chinese woman painter during the Yuan Dynasty (died 1319)
 1260: Filippo Tesauro – Italian painter active mainly in Naples (died 1320)

Deaths
 1269: Muqi Fachang – Chinese Zen Buddhist monk and renowned painter (born 1210)
 1265: Fujiwara Nobuzane – Japanese nise-e painter (born 1176)
 1262: Chen Rong – Chinese painter of the Southern Song Dynasty (born 1235)

 
Years of the 13th century in art
Art